The 2002 Davis Cup (also known as the 2002 Davis Cup by BNP Paribas for sponsorship purposes) was the 91st edition of the Davis Cup, the most important tournament between national teams in men's tennis. 130 teams entered the competition, 16 in the World Group, 28 in the Americas Zone, 32 in the Asia/Oceania Zone, and 54 in the Europe/Africa Zone. Kyrgyzstan made its first appearances in the tournament.

BNP Paribas became the Davis Cup's new Title Sponsor from this year's tournament, taking over from NEC, the previous sponsor since the 1981 tournament.

Russia defeated the defending champions France in the final, held at the Palais Omnisports de Paris-Bercy in Paris, France, on 29 November–1 December, to win their first title. This is the only time in the history of the competition that a two-set deficit has been turned around in a live fifth rubber of a Final.

World Group

Draw

Final
France vs. Russia

World Group Qualifying Round

Date: 20–22 September

The eight losing teams in the World Group first round ties and eight winners of the Zonal Group I final round ties competed in the World Group Qualifying Round for spots in the 2003 World Group.

Americas Zone

Group I
Participating Teams
 
  — advanced to World Group Qualifying Round
 
 
  — relegated to Group II in 2003
  — advanced to World Group Qualifying Round

Group II
Participating Teams
 
 
  — relegated to Group III in 2003
 
 
  — promoted to Group I in 2003
  — relegated to Group III in 2003

Group III
Participating Teams
  — relegated to Group IV in 2003
  — promoted to Group II in 2003
 
  — promoted to Group II in 2003
 
 
  — relegated to Group IV in 2003

Group IV
Participating Teams
 
 
  — promoted to Group III in 2003
 
  — promoted to Group III in 2003

Asia/Oceania Zone

Group I
Participating Teams
  — advanced to World Group Qualifying Round
 
 
  — relegated to Group II in 2003
 
 
  — advanced to World Group Qualifying Round

Group II
Participating Teams
 
 
 
 
  — relegated to Group III in 2003
  — relegated to Group III in 2003
  — promoted to Group I in 2003

Group III
Participating Teams
  — promoted to Group II in 2003
 
 
  — relegated to Group IV in 2003
  — relegated to Group IV in 2003
 
  — promoted to Group II in 2003

Group IV
Participating Teams
  — promoted to Group III in 2003
 
 
 
 
  — promoted to Group III in 2003

Europe/Africa Zone

Group I
Participating Teams
 
 
  — advanced to World Group Qualifying Round
  — advanced to World Group Qualifying Round
  — relegated to Group II in 2003
 
 
  — relegated to Group II in 2003
  — advanced to World Group Qualifying Round
  — advanced to World Group Qualifying Round

Group II
Participating Teams
  — relegated to Group III in 2003
 
 
 
 
 
  — relegated to Group III in 2003
 
  — relegated to Group III in 2003
  — promoted to Group I in 2003
  — relegated to Group III in 2003
  — promoted to Group I in 2003

Group III

Venue I
Participating Teams
 
 
 
 
  — relegated to Group IV in 2003
  — promoted to Group II in 2003
  — promoted to Group II in 2003

Venue II
Participating Teams
  — promoted to Group II in 2003
 
  — relegated to Group IV in 2003
  — relegated to Group IV in 2003
 
  — promoted to Group II in 2003

Group IV

Venue A
Participating Teams
  — promoted to Group III in 2003
  — promoted to Group III in 2003

Venue II
Participating Teams
  — promoted to Group III in 2003
  — promoted to Group III in 2003

References

General

Specific

External links
Davis Cup official website

 
Davis Cups by year
Davis Cup
Davis Cup